Fabrice Colleau (born 26 June 1977 in Saint-Renan) is a French professional football player.

His playing career was mostly spent with En Avant de Guingamp.

Whilst at Guingamp, then in Ligue 2, Colleau played in the 2009 Coupe de France Final in which they beat Rennes.

Honours
 Coupe de France winner: 2009.

References

1977 births
Living people
French footballers
Ligue 1 players
Ligue 2 players
Stade Brestois 29 players
En Avant Guingamp players
Nîmes Olympique players
Amiens SC players
FC Gueugnon players
People from Saint-Renan
Association football midfielders
Sportspeople from Finistère
Footballers from Brittany